Amnibacterium endophyticum is a Gram-positive, aerobic, non-spore-forming, short rod-shaped and non-motile bacterium from the genus of Amnibacterium which has been isolated from a branch of the tree Aegiceras corniculatum.

References

Microbacteriaceae
Bacteria described in 2018